Philip Walter Owen  (March 11, 1933 – September 30, 2021) was the 36th mayor of Vancouver, British Columbia from 1993 to 2002, making him one of Vancouver's longest serving mayors. His father was Walter S. Owen, who was Lieutenant Governor of British Columbia from 1973 to 1978.

Background
Owen was born and raised in Vancouver. He completed his education at Prince of Wales Secondary School and later New York University. In his late 20s, Owen started a textile business that later expanded to both Toronto and New York City.  He became a director of the Vancouver Art Gallery, president of the Downtown Vancouver Association, chair of St. George’s School and was involved with many other local organizations.

Political career
He entered civic politics in 1978 after being elected to the Vancouver Parks Board.  In 1986 he became a member of Vancouver City Council, and served there for seven years.

Owen was elected Vancouver’s 36th mayor in November 1993, and was re-elected in 1996 and 1999, making him Vancouver’s longest serving consecutive-term mayor.

During his nine years as mayor, the city's downtown residential population doubled from 40,000 to 80,000 and the residents enjoy a new vitality in a part of the city that continues to improve and is a model for North American cities.  The city maintained a "Triple-A" credit rating as well as being rated the number one city in the world for quality of life by the William Mercer Study.

Under his leadership, the city also opened Library Square, a new downtown headquarters for the Vancouver Public Library which features an innovative architectural design by Moshe Safdie.

Drug reform
Owen was most noted, however, for his championing of drug policy reform.

After four years of research, Owen led local and national debate to fight drug addiction problems in Canadian cities through a "Four Pillar Approach", a comprehensive program with provisions for prevention, treatment, enforcement and harm reduction. An 85-page action plan was passed unanimously by Vancouver City Council in May 2001. This new policy had the support of over 80 per cent of Vancouver's residents, as well as the Federation of Canadian Municipalities' Big City Mayor's Caucus.

As a result of the Four Pillar Approach, Vancouver opened Insite, North America's first legal safe injection site for intravenous drug users, in 2003.

Awards

Owen received recognition from many organizations, including B.C. Health Officers, Simon Fraser University, Lions International, Rotary International, the Brotherhood Inter-Faith Society, the B.C. Civil Liberties Association, the Richard J. Dennis Drugpeace Award (New York) and the Canadian Criminal Justice Association.

He served on the boards of Ovarian Cancer Canada, Opportunity International, the Salvation Army and Vancouver International Airport. In later years, he and his wife Brita travelled to drug policy reform conferences in Canada, Europe, the United States and Afghanistan.

In the spring of 2008, Owen was named a Member of the Order of Canada.

In 2014, Owen was awarded the Order of the Diocese of New Westminster in recognition of his lifelong membership of and service as a vestryman and warden to St. John's Shaughnessy.

Criticism
On February 15, 2011, Owen published letters in several major Canadian newspapers apologising for comments that he made blaming former Vancouver Police Department Inspector Kim Rossmo for delays in the investigation of serial killer Robert Pickton. During much of the Pickton investigation, Owen was the head of the Vancouver Police Board.  He was criticized for commenting, after some 20 prostitutes went missing from Vancouver's Downtown Eastside, that there was "no evidence that a serial killer is at work."

Death
Owen died of complications related to Parkinson's disease on September 30, 2021. He was 88 years old.

References

External links

1933 births
2021 deaths
Mayors of Vancouver
Members of the Order of Canada
Neurological disease deaths in British Columbia
Deaths from Parkinson's disease
20th-century Canadian politicians
21st-century Canadian politicians